Chad Anthony Engelland is an American philosopher and Professor of Philosophy at the University of Dallas. He is known for his research on the ideas of German philosopher Martin Heidegger. Engelland is a former editor-in-chief of Xavier Newswire (1998–1999).

Books
 Phenomenology. Cambridge, MA: The MIT Press, 2020
 Heidegger's Shadow: Kant, Husserl, and the Transcendental Turn.  New York: Routledge, 2017
 The Way of Philosophy: An Introduction.  Eugene, OR: Cascade Books, 2016
 Ostension: Word Learning and the Embodied Mind.  Cambridge, MA: The MIT Press, 2014

References

External links
 Chad Engelland at University of Dallas
 Works by Chad Engelland, PhilArchive
 Chad Engelland, Google Scholar Citations

21st-century American philosophers
Phenomenologists
Continental philosophers
Kant scholars
Philosophy academics
Heidegger scholars
Catholic University of America alumni
Xavier University alumni
University of Dallas faculty
Date of birth missing (living people)
Living people
Gottfried Wilhelm Leibniz scholars
Husserl scholars
Year of birth missing (living people)